James Hamilton, 2nd Earl of Clanbrassil, KG, KP, PC (I) (23 August 1730 – 6 February 1798), was an Anglo-Irish peer, styled Viscount Limerick from 1756 to 1758.

Lord Clanbrassil was the son of James Hamilton, 1st Earl of Clanbrassil, and Lady Harriet Bentinck. The Hamilton dynasty were an Ulster-Scots family by origin.

He sat in the Irish House of Commons as the Member of Parliament for Midleton between 1755 and 1758, and served as High Sheriff of Louth in 1757. On 17 March 1758, he succeeded to his father's titles and became Earl of Clanbrassil. As his title was in the Peerage of Ireland, he was not barred from election to the House of Commons of Great Britain. As such, he served as the MP for Helston from 1768 to 1774. On 4 July 1766 he was made a member of the Privy Council of Ireland and was Custos Rotulorum of County Louth between 1769 and 1798. On 5 February 1783 he was made a Knight of the Order of the Garter and on 11 March that year he was appointed a Knight Founder of the Order of St Patrick.

He married The Hon. Grace Foley, daughter of The 1st Baron Foley and The Hon. Grace Granville, on 21 May 1774 at Oxford Chapel, Marylebone. He died without issue in 1798 and his titles became extinct. His name survives in that of Clanbrassil Street, Dublin.

References

1730 births
1798 deaths
British MPs 1768–1774
Earls in the Peerage of Ireland
Knights of St Patrick
High Sheriffs of County Louth
Members of the Parliament of Great Britain for English constituencies
Members of the Privy Council of Ireland
Limerick, James Hamilton, Viscount
Members of the Parliament of Great Britain for constituencies in Cornwall
18th-century Anglo-Irish people
Knights of the Garter
Members of the Parliament of Ireland (pre-1801) for County Cork constituencies